Minor Details is a 2009 mystery film that was directed by John Lyde, based on a script written by Sally Meyer and Anne M. Edwards. It stars Caitlin EJ Meyer and Danielle Chuchran as two teenage girls who must help discover why a mysterious epidemic of sickness is starting to take over the school.

Plot
Danforth Academy is an upscale boarding school where extremely wealthy families send their children. Four students, Abby, Paige, Claire, and Taylor, make friends with one another despite some initial misgivings and band together to solve the mystery of why students are falling sick after eating the cafeteria food. They believe that it may be someone targeting various groups at school such as the cheerleaders and theatre kids, but cannot come up with a reason as to why this is happening.

They compile a list of suspects: the super-wealthy Mia and Riley, wacky Sean, the strange Professor Plume, and Emily, the intelligent daughter of the principal. Eventually, the students discover that the culprit is Mia, whose father owns a vending machine business. She wanted to attend modeling camp and used ipecac to trick everyone into thinking that the cafeteria food was contaminated in order to drive up sales to the vending machines, which are owned by her father.

Cast
 Kelsey Edwards as Abby 
 Caitlin EJ Meyer as Paige
 Danielle Churchran as Claire Barlow
 Lauren Faber as Taylor Williams
 Jennette McCurdy as Mia Maxwell
 Emma Duke as Emily Littman
 Savannah Jayde as Riley Jackson
 Brady Edwards as Brad
 Andrew Cottrill as Sean
 Steve Anderson as Professor Plume
 Susanne Sutchy as Principal Littman
 Elijah Thomas as Ethan
 Frank Gerrish as Sgt. Aimes
 Charan Prabhakar as Coach Johnson
 Danor Gerald as Oscar
 Clara Susan Morey II as Nurse Betty
 Christy Summerhays as Pauline
 Shauna Thompson as Shelly
 Joel Bishop as Tom
 Dakota Edwards as Ben
 Jennifer Klekas as Coach Hallows
 Tori Ramert as Samantha
 Colleen Baum as Elsie
 Samantha Endicott as Gracie
 Rachelle Faber as Janis
 Ruby Chase as Meena (as Ruby Chase O'Neil)
 Tatiana Galindo as Lindsay Pepper
 Whitney Lee as Vanessa Guss
 Sloane Endicott as Waitress

Development 
Filming for Minor Details took place in Utah Valley during 2008.

Reception 
Common Sense Media rated the film at 2/5 stars, stating that it was a "Ho-hum mystery/comedy for tweens". The Dove Foundation awarded Minor Details a "Family-Approved" Seal and wrote that it was "a charming funny mystery that will be enjoyed by the entire family".

References

External links

2009 films
2000s mystery films
American mystery films
2000s English-language films
2000s American films